Dakota Lane (born in Brooklyn, New York in 1959) is an author. She has been nominated for an American Library Association award three times and cited as a Best Book for Young Adults for Johnny Voodoo and 2008 Quick Picks for Reluctant Young Adult Readers.

Awards
1997 American Library Association Best Books for Young Adults, Johnny Voodoo
2000 Young Adult Library Services Association (YALSA) List of Popular Paperbacks for Young Adults
2008 YALSA List of Quick Picks for Reluctant Young Adult Readers, The Secret Life of IT Girls

Bibliography
 Johnny Voodoo (Random House, 1997)
 The Orpheus Obsession (HarperCollins, 2006)
 The Secret Life of It Girls (Simon & Schuster, 2007)
 Gothic Lolita (Simon & Schuster, 2008)

References

External links
 Dakota Lane official page at Simon & Schuster

1959 births
Living people
20th-century American novelists
21st-century American novelists
American women novelists
American writers of young adult literature
20th-century American women writers
21st-century American women writers
Women writers of young adult literature